The MV Treasure oil spill occurred on 23 June 2000, when the ship sank six miles off the coast of South Africa while transporting iron ore from China to Brazil. The ship was carrying an estimated 1,300 tons  of fuel oil, some of which spilled into the ocean, threatening the African penguin populations living on nearby islands. Cleanup efforts began promptly after the incident with particular attention being paid to salvaging the 
penguin communities.

Background

MV Treasure was a Panamanian-registered cargo ship. The 17-year-old vessel was transporting  of iron ore from China to Brazil at the time of the incident. The Weekend Argus newspaper quoted unnamed sources as saying the ship was owned by Universal Pearls, which it claimed to be the same Chinese shipping company that owned  (which sank off Cape Town's coast in 1994 and caused extensive environmental damage).

Cause
Treasure sank on 23 June 2000 from structural damage sustained in foul weather. Authorities wanted to tow the ship into the South African harbor for repair, but she was too large for the maneuver and was ordered farther off-shore in an attempt to reduce environmental damage from oil pollution. While under tow in rough seas the tow ropes ripped loose. The ship then drifted eastward and sank. The ship's crew were airlifted to safety.

Amount and type of oil spilled
Treasure was estimated to have been carrying 1,300 tons of bunker oil of which 400 tons, approximately 2,680 barrels, spilled into the sea off the coast.
The oil spilled was the ship's own fuel oil, which was of the heaviest and most viscous commercial fuel that can be obtained from petroleum. Bunker oil, also known as fuel oil, is what remains after the lighter fractions (gasoline, kerosene, diesel, etc.) are removed by distillation. The heaviest materials in crude petroleum are not distilled, as their boiling points are too high to be conveniently recovered. As a result, bunker oil is usually very dark in color, more dense, and a significantly more serious contaminant than less-dense oils.

Environmental effects
Aside from causing the temporary closing of South Africa's ports and threats to species of gannets, cormorants, and seals, Treasure bunker oil spill was dubbed South Africa's worst environmental disaster, as it seriously threatened its population of African penguins. The spill mainly affected African penguin colonies inhabiting South Africa's Robben and Dassen Islands, which support the largest and third largest colonies of African penguins in the world. The worldwide population of African penguins is numbered at less than 180,000, and is declining. About 150,000 African penguins live off South Africa's coast, 19,000 of which live on Robben Island. The Robben Island nature reserve, home to about 14,000 endangered adult African penguins and 6,000 chicks, was hit badly during their breeding season by the oil spill. Over 20,000 penguins were oiled and approximately 2,000 died.

Cleanup efforts
South African Maritime Safety Authority (SAMSA) spokesman Pim Zandee reported that divers confirmed the ship had suffered structural damage when sinking and that oil globules were rising from cracks in the hull. It was also reported that engine room vents, which leaked a steady stream of oil, were closed off, drastically reducing the amount of oil polluting the surface. The dive team continued to seal oil leakages from the wreck. Three days after the sinking, the dive team reported that very little oil was leaking out of the ship.

Different types of methods were used in the cleanup of the oil spill, two of which included workers loading kelp covered in oil into trucks and vacuuming up pools of oil with specially designed vacuums. In addition, booms were used to keep the oil from entering Cape Town Harbor.

South African company Bio-Matrix was contracted to help clean up the oil slick that was polluting the penguins' habitats. The company used a Canadian product, also called Bio-Matrix, made of sphagnum moss properties, which are notable for their natural ability to soak up oil. Bio-matrix works by encapsulating oil without absorbing water. Bio-Matrix is also effective in helping break down and digest oil.

The African penguin rescue effort was one of the largest bird rescue missions undertaken thanks to its many volunteers and teams of professionals. The rescue effort consisted of washing and rehabilitating already-oiled birds and capturing non-oiled birds as a preemptive measure. Within ten days of the Treasure spill, 20,251 oiled African penguins were admitted into the rehabilitation center in Cape Town, and 90% of the oiled birds were rehabilitated and released. Another 19,500 non-oiled penguins were relocated successfully.

The rehabilitation effort was greatly funded by the International Fund for Animal Welfare, which worked together with the local rehabilitation center, the Southern African Foundation for the Conservation of Coastal Birds (SANCCOB), and the International Bird Rescue Center (IBRRC), whose oiled wildlife team took action the same day the cargo ship sank. The 12-week rehabilitation process, which cared for over 20,000 birds, required over 130 international team members supervising over 45,000 volunteers, 400 tons of fish to feed the penguins, 7,000 tons of beach sand used in bird pens, and 302  containers of detergent to wash the oil off the penguins' feathers. Follow-up studies included the tracking of penguins.

Dive site
Treasure is now a recreational dive site. The ship's large size and the facts that its hull is resting on a flat sand bottom at  down, and part of its main deck is within  of the surface, coupled with its location in the Bloubergstrand area near Cape Town, South Africa, have contributed to its popularity.

References

External links

Link to Consortium Website
The Gulf of Mexico Research Initiative

2000 in the environment
2000 in South Africa
Maritime incidents in 2000
Treasure
June 2000 events in South Africa